Devender Lohchab (born 5 November 1992) is an Indian cricketer. He made his first-class debut for Services in the 2014–15 Ranji Trophy on 7 December 2014. he born in village Bupania district Jhajjar , Haryana. He start playing cricket in Gulia cricket academy in Badli. He is serve in Indian Navy.

References

External links
 

1992 births
Living people
Indian cricketers
Services cricketers
Place of birth missing (living people)